The krone (alternatively crown; , , , , , , ,) was the official currency of Austria-Hungary from 1892 (when it replaced the gulden as part of the adoption of the gold standard) until the dissolution of the empire in 1918.

Name 

These terms all translate to the English word crown.

The symbol of the currency was the abbreviation K. or sometimes Kr.

History

Introduction 
After several earlier attempts the Austro-Hungarian Empire adopted the gold standard in 1892 according to a plan drawn up by the Hungarian Minister of Finance Sándor Wekerle. This plan included the introduction of the new currency, the Krone. It consisted of 100 Heller (Austria) or Fillér (Hungary). The value of the Krone was set at 2 kronen = 1 gulden. From 1900 onward, Krone notes were the only legal banknotes of the Empire.

First World War 
The currency depreciated sharply as a result of the First World War, which was financed mostly by the issue of War Bonds rather than through taxation. Consumer prices rose sixteenfold during the war, as the government had no hesitation in running the Austro-Hungarian Bank's printing presses to pay its bills: this triggered a higher inflation rate than in other combatant countries.

After 1918

Austria 

After the end of the First World War it was initially hoped that the Krone might remain the common currency of the Empire's successor states, but in January 1919 the Kingdom of Serbs, Croats, and Slovenes (later Yugoslavia) became the first successor state to overstamp the Austro-Hungarian Bank's notes, limiting their validity to its own territory. Czechoslovakia followed suit in February 1919, and on 12 March 1919 the new Republic of Austria stamped the notes circulating in its territory with "DEUTSCHÖSTERREICH".

The Austrian economy did not stabilise after the war, and a period of hyperinflation followed: the money supply increased from 12 to 30 billion Kronen in 1920, and to about 147 billion Kronen at the end of 1921. In August 1922 consumer prices were 14,000 times greater than before the start of the war eight years earlier. The highest-denomination banknote issued was the 500,000 Kronen note, issued in 1922. Faith in the currency had been lost, and people spent money as fast as they received it. In October 1922 Austria secured a loan of 650 million gold Kronen from the League of Nations, with a League of Nations Commissioner supervising the country's finances. This stabilized the currency at a rate of 14,400 paper Kronen to 1 gold Krone. On 2 January 1923 the Austrian National Bank (Österreichische Nationalbank) began operations, taking over control of the currency from the Austro-Hungarian Bank which had gone into liquidation.

In December 1923 the Austrian Parliament authorised the government to issue silver 5,000, 10,000, and 20,000-kronen coins which were to be designated half-Schilling, Schilling, and double Schilling. The Schilling became the official currency of Austria currency on 20 December 1924, at a rate of 10,000 Kronen to 1 Schilling.

Over-stamped Austro-Hungarian krone

Croatia, Slovenia and Bosnia and Herzegovina 

In these territories of Austria-Hungary, which became part of the Kingdom of the Serbs, Croats and Slovenes (later Yugoslavia) in 1918, Krone banknotes were stamped by the new authorities and became issues of the Serb, Croat and Slovene krone. In 1920 this was replaced by the dinar at a rate of 1 dinar = 4 Kronen.

Czechoslovakia 

In Czechoslovakia the currency was superseded by the koruna, at par. The names of the present-day koruna and haléř (in the Czech Republic) and the pre-Euro koruna and halier (in Slovakia) are derived from the Austro-Hungarian Krone and Heller.

Fiume  

The Fiume Krone (Corona Fiumana) - (Cor., FiuK) was introduced on 18 April 1919 by over-printing the existing Austro-Hungarian Krone notes, under the authority of the Italian National Council of Fiume who ruled the city. There were two issues: the 1919/21 Issue (1 and 2 kronen), and the 1920 Issue (2, 10, 20, 50, 100, and 1,000 kronen). The over-printed notes were in circulation from April 1919 to February 1921. In September 1920 the Italian Lira was introduced as the official currency. The unofficial exchange rate to the lira was 2.5 FiuK to 1 Lira.

Hungary 

In Hungary the Austro-Hungarian currency was overstamped and then replaced by the Hungarian korona at par. The Hungarian korona was devalued by hyperinflation, due to the consequences of World War I and the Treaty of Trianon. It was replaced by the pengő on 21 January 1927, at a rate of 12,500 korona to 1 pengő.

Romania 

In Romania there were two issues of over-stamped notes: the 1919 First Provisional Issue (stamp on the Austrian side of the note), and the 1919 Second Provisional Issue (stamp on the Hungarian side). Both issues included 10, 20, 50, 100, 1000, and 10,000 korona denominations. The issue dates of the base Austro-Hungarian krone notes used ranged from 1902 to 1918.

Complete denomination sets of over-stamped notes

Historic exchange rates and prices

Coins

Banknotes 

Krone banknotes were designed and printed in Vienna from 1900 onward. These banknotes were used throughout the Monarchy.  All banknotes issued by the Austro-Hungarian Bank were bilingual in German and Hungarian: the denomination was also indicated in other languages of the Monarchy. Until World War I, all banknotes had a German and a Hungarian side; during the war, some banknotes were issued with text in both languages on either side.  The designers included Koloman Moser, Rudolf Rössler, Josef Pfeiffer and László Hegedűs. The engraver was Ferdinand Schirnböck.

References

Notes

Sources

External links

  bankjegy.szabadsagharcos.org (Hungarian banknote catalog)
  www.numismatics.hu (Roman and Hungarian related numismatic site)
  papirpenz.hu (pictures of Hungarian banknotes)
  www.eremgyujtok.hu (homepage of the Hungarian Coin Collectors' Society)
aes.iupui.edu/rwise (pictures of Austro-Hungarian banknotes at Ron Wise's World Paper Money Homepage)
geldschein.at (nearly 1000 pictures of Austro-Hungarian banknotes + collectors information)
austriannotes.com - paper money and history of Austria (Austrian banknotes explained and historical background information)

Currencies of Austria
Krone
Economic history of Austria
1892 establishments in Austria-Hungary
1918 disestablishments in Austria-Hungary